Jimmy Birdsong (April 27, 1925 – February 9, 2013) was an American politician. He served as a Democratic member for the 45th district of the Oklahoma Senate.

Life and career 
Birdsong was born in Little Rock, Arkansas, the son of Jewell and J. E. Birdsong. He moved to Oklahoma City, Oklahoma when he was young. He served in the United States Army during World War II and attended the University of Oklahoma.

In 1965, Birdsong was elected to represent the 45th district of the Oklahoma Senate. He left office in 1981, when he was succeeded by Ed Moore. He was a police officer for the Oklahoma City Police Department, and also a lawyer.

Birdsong died in February 2013 at his home, at the age of 87.

References 

1925 births
2013 deaths
Politicians from Little Rock, Arkansas
Democratic Party Oklahoma state senators
20th-century American politicians
University of Oklahoma alumni
Oklahoma lawyers